Émile Poilvé (September 22, 1903 – October 11, 1962) was a French wrestler who won the gold medal at the 1936 Olympic Games in Berlin. France had to wait 72 years and Steeve Guenot at the 2008 Beijing Olympic Games to win another gold medal in wrestling. He also competed at the 1928 Summer Olympics and the 1932 Summer Olympics.

References

External links
 

1903 births
1962 deaths
Olympic wrestlers of France
Olympic medalists in wrestling
French male sport wrestlers
Medalists at the 1936 Summer Olympics
Olympic gold medalists for France
Wrestlers at the 1928 Summer Olympics
Wrestlers at the 1932 Summer Olympics
Wrestlers at the 1936 Summer Olympics
20th-century French people